A variety of Kent county cricket teams played matches from the early 18th century until the formation of the original county club in 1842. The county's links to cricket go back further with Kent and Sussex generally accepted as the birthplace of the sport. It is widely believed that cricket was first played by children living on the Weald in Saxon or Norman times. The world's earliest known organised match was held in Kent c.1611 and the county has always been at the forefront of cricket's development through the growth of village cricket in the 17th century to representative matches in the 18th. A Kent team took part in the earliest known inter-county match, which was played on Dartford Brent in 1709.

Several famous players and patrons were involved in Kent cricket from then until the creation of the first county club in 1842. Among them were William Bedle, Robert Colchin and the 3rd Duke of Dorset. Kent were generally regarded as the strongest county team in the first half of the 18th century and were usually one of the main challengers to Hambledon in the second half. County cricket ceased through the Napoleonic War and was resurrected in 1826 when Kent played Sussex. By the 1830s, Kent had again become the strongest county and remained so until mid-century. The original Kent County Cricket Club was created in 1842.

Early cricket in Kent
Cricket is believed to have developed out of other bat-and-ball games and was probably first played in early medieval times to the south and south-east of London in the geographical areas of the North Downs, the South Downs and the Weald; hence, the counties of Kent, Sussex and Surrey were its earliest centres of excellence. The world's earliest known organised match took place in Kent, c.1611, at Chevening. A later court case described it as a "cricketing of the Weald and the Upland versus the Chalk Hill". Cricket became established in Kent and its neighbouring counties through the 17th century with the development of village cricket and it is possible that the earliest county teams were formed in the aftermath of the Restoration in 1660.

In 1705, a newspaper recorded an 11-a-side match between West of Kent and Chatham at a place called "Maulden", which does not exist. Historians have surmised that the venue must have been either Maidstone or Malling (later West of Kent teams played at Maidstone). Four years later, what is nominally the earliest known inter-county match took place when a Kent team met one from Surrey on Dartford Brent. It is generally believed, as asserted by G. B. Buckley, that "inter-county matches" till about 1730 were really inter-parish matches involving two villages on either side of a county boundary. Dartford was an important club in the first half of the 18th century and its team at this time featured William Bedle, who is acknowledged to have been cricket's first great player. The 1709 match is the earliest known mention of Dartford Brent as a venue.

18th century
The Association of Cricket Statisticians and Historians (ACS) considers Kent to be one of cricket's "major counties" throughout its entire history and rates all Kent county matches in the 18th and 19th centuries, as well as many played by teams called East Kent or West Kent, as important (per the name of their guide, or top-class. The ACS have explained that any match between a strong Kent eleven and another top-class team justifies the classification but caution is needed with nomenclature because of the different committees and sponsors who organised the games and would sometimes use team names other than "Kent".

Dartford came under the patronage of Edwin Stead through the 1720s and its team became representative of Kent as a county, often playing against teams from Sussex. Stead developed a keen rivalry with the Sussex patrons Charles Lennox, 2nd Duke of Richmond, and Sir William Gage. Their teams were named by either county or patron's XI. There were three Kent v Sussex matches in 1728 and Stead's team won them all. After the third win, a newspaper reported the outcome as "the third time this summer that the Kent men have been too expert for those of Sussex".

The 1728 proclamation of Kent's superiority is the first time that the concept of a "Champion County" can be seen in the sources and it is augmented by a "turned the scales" comment made by a reporter after Sussex defeated Kent in 1729. The 1729 report added that the "scale of victory had been on the Kentish side for some years past". In 1730, a newspaper referred to the "Kentish champions". In his cricket history, Harry Altham titled his third chapter, which was about cricket in the second quarter of the 18th century, as "Kent, The First Champions".

Strong teams played under the name of Kent throughout the 18th century with several famous patrons including Stead, Robert Colchin ("Long Robin"), Lord John Sackville, his son John Frederick Sackville, 3rd Duke of Dorset and Sir Horatio Mann organising teams. In July 1739, the strength of Kent as a county team was recognised by the formation of an England team, loosely termed "All-England" or, more accurately, the Rest of England, to play against them. Kent at this time were led by Lord John Sackville and his team won the first All-England match on Bromley Common; the return on the Artillery Ground was drawn.

In 1744, the year in which the Laws of Cricket were first published as a code, Kent met England four times. The most famous encounter was the one on Monday, 18 June at the Artillery Ground which was commemorated in a poem by James Love and is the subject of the world's second oldest scorecard. It is also the opening match in Scores and Biographies (although this erroneously records the date as 1746). Kent, whose team included both Colchin and Sackville, won the match by one wicket.

Under the Duke of Dorset and Sir Horatio Mann, Kent continued to field a strong team through the last quarter of the 18th century and were, along with Surrey, the main challengers to Hampshire whose team was organised by the Hambledon Club. Dartford had played against a Hambledon team three times in 1756 and Kent played against Hampshire at Broadhalfpenny Down in 1768. Kent played numerous inter-county matches through the 1770s and 1780s, mostly against Hampshire and Surrey. Renowned Kent players in this period included William Bullen, Robert Clifford, Joseph Miller and John Minshull. Large crowds were attracted to games in the county and Derek Birley states in his history that 20,000 gathered at Bourne Paddock for a match against Hampshire in 1772. Kent remained an active county team until 1796 when, probably because of the Napoleonic War, county cricket ceased and was not resurrected until 1825 when Kent met Sussex at Brighton's Royal New Ground.<

19th century

In the 1822 MCC v Kent match at Lord's, John Willes of Kent opened the bowling and was no-balled for using a roundarm action, a style he had attempted to introduce since 1807. Willes promptly withdrew from the match and refused to play again in any important fixture. His action proved the catalyst for the so-called "roundarm revolution".

By the 1830s Kent sides began to dominate English cricket, winning 98 matches during the period and being declared the leading county side for six seasons out of the seven between 1837 and 1843. During this period the formation of county sides was initially focused on Town Malling Cricket Club, backed by lawyers Thomas Selby and Silas Norton alongside William Harris, 2nd Baron Harris. Selby and Norton recruited "the best batsman in England", Fuller Pilch of Norfolk, to play at Town Malling, maintain the cricket ground and run the connected public house. Alongside other players such as Alfred Mynn, Nicholas Felix, Ned Wenman and William Hillyer, Kent teams selected by Selby played eleven matches at Town Malling between 1836 and 1841. The expense of running county games meant that Town Malling proved too small to support a county club, despite the large attendances that games attracted, and in 1842 Pilch moved to the Beverley club at Canterbury.

Kent struggled against the prominence of Sussex in the early roundarm years but then enjoyed a glorious period in the middle of the century. Rowland Bowen has recorded that a Maidstone newspaper in 1837 described a match between Kent and Nottinghamshire as for the County Championship. This is the earliest known use of the term although the concept of a "Champion County" was much older. Kent was duly proclaimed Champion County in 1837 and through most of the 1840s. Mainstays of the Kent team in those years included Alfred Mynn, Fuller Pilch, Nicholas Wanostrocht aka "Felix", Ned Wenman and William Hillyer.

On 6 August 1842, formation of the original Kent County Cricket Club took place in Canterbury. The new club played its initial first-class match against England on the White Hart Field in Bromley on 25–27 August 1842. On 1 March 1859, a second county club was established in Maidstone to support the Canterbury club. The two were amalgamated in 1870 to form the present county club.

References

Bibliography
 
 
 
 
 
 
 
 
 
 
 
 
 
 
 
 

Cricket in Kent
English cricket teams in the 18th century
English cricket in the 19th century
Former senior cricket clubs
History of Kent